Defryme are an Australian band from Melbourne, Victoria. They formed in 1989 in the Melbourne suburb of Frankston.  Their album Purekiller reached #4 on the Australian ARIA album charts in June 1994. They had four charting singles in Australia, "God Inside A Man" (#51), "Pure Killer" (#70), their cover of L.L. Cool J's "Mama Said Knock You Out" (#38), and "Sanity" (#70).  Defryme reformed in 2010 with the release of the single 'Sup?' and a handful of shows. Defryme re-emerged in 2014 with a string of live shows in Melbourne and Sydney performing the classic "Purekiller" album in entirety and released another single "Audrey". Defryme also recorded a number of songs for "Guitar Gods LIVE @ Pony Music" - a series of Live in the Studio videos filmed for Guitar Gods and Masterpieces TV show.
Enter the end of 2021 which sees a re-birth of DEFRYME with a couple of new members and a re-energised passion for performance. Signed to GOLDEN ROBOT RECORDS with first single release "The Snake" and the return to live performances.

Discography

Albums

Extended plays

Singles

References

External links
Facebook Page

Musical groups from Melbourne
Australian hard rock musical groups
Funk metal musical groups
1989 establishments in Australia
Musical groups established in 1989